The 2013 African Rally Championship is the 33rd season of the African Rally Championship (ARC). This Championship is the FIA regional rally championship for the African continent. The season began March 1 in Côte d'Ivoire, and ended approximately on November 9 in Madagascar, after eight events.

Ugandan driver Jas Mangat leads the championship by eight points over Zambian driver Mohamed Essa and ten over Zambian driver Jassy Singh. Mangat won the Tanzania Rally, was third in the Zambia International Rally and was the second ARC competitor to finish in the Safari Rally. Essa won the Zambia Rally and was the first ARC driver to finish the Safari Rally. Singh has two second places in the ARC from rallies in South Africa and Tanzania. The points victors of Rallye Bandama Cote d'Ivoire and Rally South Africa have had no other finishes.

Race calendar and results

The 2013 African Rally Championship is as follows:

Championship standings
The 2013 African Rally Championship points are as follows:

References

External links
Official website

African Rally Championship
African
Rally Championship